This list of King's College London alumni comprises notable graduates as well as non-graduate former, and current, students.  It also includes those who may be considered alumni by extension, having studied at institutions later merged with King's College London.  It does not include those whose only connection with the college is (i) being a member of the staff, or (ii) the conferral of an honorary degree or honorary fellowship.

Government and politics

Heads of state and government

United Kingdom

Current Members of the House of Commons
Alex Burghart – Conservative MP
Mark Francois – Conservative MP
John Glen – Conservative MP
Dan Jarvis – Labour MP and also former Mayor of the Sheffield City Region
Fay Jones – Conservative MP
Brandon Lewis – Conservative MP
Gagan Mohindra – Conservative MP
Matthew Offord – Conservative MP
Sarah Olney – Liberal Democrat MP
Dan Poulter – Conservative MP
Lucy Powell – Labour MP
Bob Seely – Conservative MP
Tulip Siddiq – Labour MP
Sir Gary Streeter – Conservative MP
Gareth Thomas – Labour MP
Michael Tomlinson – Conservative MP
David Warburton – Independent MP

Current Members of the House of Lords

George Carey, Baron Carey of Clifton – Former Archbishop of Canterbury
Alex Carlile, Baron Carlile of Berriew – Crossbench peer
Stanley Clinton Davis, Baron Clinton-Davis – Labour peer and former EU Commissioner
Tim Dakin – Bishop of Winchester and Lord Spiritual
Andrew Dunlop, Baron Dunlop – Conservative peer
Christopher Geidt, Baron Geidt – Crossbench peer
Nick Holtam – Bishop of Salisbury and Lord Spiritual
Ajay Kakkar, Baron Kakkar – Crossbench peer
John MacGregor, Baron MacGregor of Pulham Market – Conservative peer
Sally Morgan, Baroness Morgan of Huyton – Labour Peer
Nuala O'Loan, Baroness O'Loan – Crossbench peer
David Owen, Baron Owen – Crossbench peer and former Foreign Secretary
Raymond Plant, Baron Plant of Highfield – Labour peer
Ted Rowlands, Baron Rowlands – Labour peer
Jonathan Sacks, Baron Sacks – former Chief Rabbi of the United Kingdom and Crossbench Peer
Tim Thornton – Bishop of Truro and Lord Spiritual
Mary Watkins, Baroness Watkins of Tavistock – Crossbench peer

Other UK politicians

 
Steve Aiken – Member of the Northern Irish Assembly
Sir Ronald Wilberforce Allen – Liberal MP
Charles Bagnall – Conservative MP
Jacob Bell – Liberal MP
Sir John Bethell, 1st Baron Bethell – Liberal peer
Sir Patrick Bishop – Conservative MP
Terence Boston, Baron Boston of Faversham – Crossbench peer
Thomas Bowles – Conservative and Liberal MP, founder of Vanity Fair magazine
James Boyden – Labour MP
Richard Braine – Leader of the UK Independence Party
Alexander Brogden – Liberal MP
Sir Edmund Byrne – Conservative MP
Douglas Carswell – Conservative, UKIP and Independent MP
Sir George Chetwynd – Labour MP
Gavin Brown Clark – Liberal MP
Michael Clark – Conservative MP
Sir Edward Clarke – Conservative MP and Solicitor General for England and Wales
Tim Collins – Conservative MP
Sir Henry Cotton – Liberal MP and President of the Indian National Congress
Sir Nic Dakin – Labour MP
James Dalziel, 1st Baron Dalziel of Kirkcaldy – Liberal peer
John Dunwoody – Labour MP
Natascha Engel – Labour MP
William Finnie – Liberal MP
Henry Neville Gladstone, 1st Baron Gladstone of Hawarden – son and Private Secretary to William Gladstone
Sir Richard Glass – Conservative MP
Sir Augustus Godson – Conservative MP
Joseph Green – National Democratic MP
Robert Grosvenor, 2nd Baron Ebury – Liberal peer
George Peabody Gooch – Liberal MP and historian
Joseph Hardcastle – Liberal MP
Charles Harrison – Liberal MP
Sir John Heaton, 1st Baronet – Conservative MP
Charles Hopwood – Liberal MP
Collingwood Hughes – Conservative MP
Sir Clarendon Hyde – Liberal MP
Frank James – Conservative MP
Edward Johnson – Liberal MP
Phillip Lee – Liberal Democrat MP
James Lowther, 1st Viscount Ullswater – Speaker of the House of Commons (1905–1921)
Fiona Mactaggart – Labour MP
Sir John Maple, 1st Baronet – Conservative MP
John Marek – Labour MP
George Croydon Marks, 1st Baron Marks – Labour peer
Tom Mason – Conservative Member of the Scottish Parliament
Horace Maybray King, Baron Maybray-King – Speaker of the House of Commons (1965–1970)
Oonagh McDonald – Labour MP
Allan Glaisyer Minns – First Black Mayor of a town/city in the UK
Julie Morgan – Labour MP and Welsh Assembly Member
Charles Newdegate – Conservative MP
Sarah Newton – Conservative MP
Evan Pateshall – Conservative MP
Augustus Paulet, 15th Marquess of Winchester
Sir Robert Perks, 1st Baronet – Liberal MP
Colwyn Philipps, 3rd Viscount St Davids – Conservative peer
Sir Philip Pilditch, 1st Baronet – Conservative MP
William Priestley – Conservative MP
John Puleston – Conservative MP
Henry George Purchase – Liberal MP
Pandeli Ralli – Liberal MP
Sir William Rattigan – Liberal Unionist MP and Vice-Chancellor of Punjab University
Thorold Rogers – Liberal MP and economist
Sir John Rolleston – Conservative MP
Sir Hugh Rossi – Conservative MP
Dame Angela Rumbold – Conservative MP
Sir Arthur Salter – Conservative MP and judge
Keith Simpson – Conservative MP
Michael Stapleton-Cotton, 5th Viscount Combermere – Crossbench peer
Howard Stoate – Labour MP
Edward Anthony Strauss – Liberal MP
Edith Summerskill, Baroness Summerskill – Labour peer
George Sutherland-Leveson-Gower, 3rd Duke of Sutherland – Liberal peer
Jeffrey Thomas – Labour MP
Sir Gerard Folliot Vaughan – Conservative MP
Sir Kenneth Warren – Conservative MP
Harold Watkinson, 1st Viscount Watkinson – Conservative peer and Cabinet Minister
Sidney Webb, 1st Baron Passfield – Labour peer and Cabinet Minister; also the co-founder of London School of Economics (LSE)
John Shiress Will – Liberal MP
John Wilmot, 1st Baron Wilmot of Selmeston – Labour peer
Sarah Wollaston – Conservative and Liberal MP
Henry de Worms, 1st Baron Pirbright – Conservative peer
Simon Wright – Liberal Democrat MP

Other politicians

Europe

Recep Akdağ – Deputy Prime Minister of Turkey
Georgios Anastassopoulos – Greek MEP
Paul Balban – Gibraltarian Member of Parliament
Patrick Belton – Member of the Irish Dáil
Konstantinos Bogdanos – Member of the Hellenic Parliament
Tom de Bruijn – Dutch Foreign Minister
Magnus Brunner – Member of the Austrian Federal Council
Haresh Budhrani – Speaker of the Gibraltar Parliament
Yehor Cherniev – Member of the Ukrainian Verkhovna Rada
Gordan Georgiev – Member of the Assembly of the Republic of North Macedonia
Alexandre Holroyd – Member of the French National Assembly
Kamal Jafarov – Member of the Azerbaijan Parliament
Pål Jonson – Swedish Defence Minister
Olga Kefalogianni – Greek Cabinet Minister
Emil Kirjas – Macedonian politician
Hannelore Kraft – Minister-President of North Rhine-Westphalia
Gabriel Kroon – Member of the Swedish Riksdag
Axelle Lemaire – French Minister for Digital Affairs
Bernardino León – Head of the United Nations Support Mission in Libya
Oliver Luksic – Member of the German Bundestag
Bilal Macit – Member of the Grand National Assembly of Turkey
Edgar Mann – Chairman of the Executive Council of the Isle of Man
Nickolay Mladenov – UN Special Coordinator for the Middle East Peace Process and former Bulgarian Foreign Minister
Giulia Moi – Italian MEP
James Moorhouse – Conservative and Liberal Democrat MEP
Krisztina Morvai – Hungarian MEP
Eoghan Murphy – Member of the Irish Dáil
Pambos Papageorgiou – Member of the Cypriot House of Representatives
Peter Price – Conservative MEP
Jiří Šedivý – Czech Defence Minister
Shaun Spiers – Labour MEP
Eleni Stavrou – Member of the Cypriot House of Representatives
Kay Swinburne – Conservative MEP
Spyros Taliadouros – Member of the Hellenic Parliament
Rebecca Taylor – Liberal Democrat MEP
Jef Van Damme – Member of the Parliament of the Brussels-Capital Region

Americas

Francis Black – Canadian politician
Hector Cameron – Member of the Canadian House of Commons
Catherine Dorion – Member of the National Assembly of Quebec
Andrew Exum – Middle East Scholar and Deputy Assistant Secretary of Defense for Middle East Policy
Jerome Fitzgerald – Bahamian Education Minister
Bob Frankford – Member of the Legislative Assembly of Ontario
Colleen Graffy – U.S. Deputy Assistant Secretary of State
Richard Willis Jameson – Member of the Canadian House of Commons
John Hillen – U.S. Assistant Secretary of State for Political-Military Affairs
Anne McLellan – Deputy Prime Minister of Canada
Sir Shridath Ramphal – Commonwealth Secretary-General (1975–1990) and Guyanese Foreign Minister
Christina Rocca – US Assistant Secretary of State for South and Central Asian Affairs
David Arthur Singh – Guyanese Cabinet Minister
Yaneth Giha Tovar – Colombian Education Minister
Frederick Wills – Guyanese Foreign Minister

Asia

Shafique Ahmed – Bangladeshi Justice Minister
Marriyum Aurangzeb – Member of the Pakistani National Assembly
Maragatham Chandrasekar – Member of the Indian Lok Sabha
Teresa Cheng – Secretary for Justice (Hong Kong)
Azhar Azizan Harun – Speaker of the Dewan Rakyat
Tan Chuan-Jin – Speaker of the Parliament of Singapore
Kakoli Ghosh Dastidar – Member of the Indian Lok Sabha
Colvin R. de Silva – Sri Lankan Cabinet Minister
Christopher de Souza – Deputy Speaker of the Parliament of Singapore
Sushmita Dev – Member of the Indian Lok Sabha
Faisal Saleh Hayat – Pakistani Interior Minister
Anisul Huq – Bangladeshi Justice Minister
Faizah Jamal – Member of the Singaporean Parliament
Wan Ahmad Fayhsal Wan Ahmad Kamal – Malaysian Senator
Sir Muhammad Zafarullah Khan – President of the UN General Assembly (1962), the International Court of Justice and Pakistani Foreign Minister
Sikandar Hayat Khan – Prime Minister of Punjab
Dennis Kwok – Member of the Hong Kong Legislative Council
Ahmad Massoud – National Resistance Front of Afghanistan leader
Gholam Mujtaba – Pakistani Politician
Sarojini Naidu – President of the Indian National Congress
Nik Nazmi – Malaysian Cabinet Minister
Sania Nishtar – Pakistani Education Minister
S. C. C. Anthony Pillai – Member of the Indian Lok Sabha
G. G. Ponnambalam – Sri Lankan Cabinet Minister
S. Rajaratnam – Deputy Prime Minister of Singapore
Pritam Singh – Singaporean Opposition Leader
Sirichok Sopha – Member of the Thai House of Representatives
Hayashi Tadasu – Japanese Foreign Minister
Desmond Tan – Member of the Singaporean Parliament
Rais Yatim – Malaysian Foreign Minister, President of the Dewan Negara
Alvin Yeo – Member of the Singaporean Parliament

Middle East
Alia Aldahlawi – Member of the Consultative Assembly of Saudi Arabia
Mowaffak al-Rubaie – Member of the Iraqi Governing Council
Ronen Hoffman – Member of the Israeli Knesset
Ahmad Masa'deh – Jordanian politician
Juwan Fouad Masum – Minister in the Iraqi Transitional Government
Mohamed Qubaty – Yemeni Cabinet Minister
Hayat Sindi – Member of the Consultative Assembly of Saudi Arabia

Africa

Hassan al-Turabi – Sudanese Foreign Minister
Obed Asamoah – Ghanaian Foreign Minister
Ziad Bahaa-Eldin – Deputy Prime Minister of Egypt
Abdulai Conteh – Vice President of Sierra Leone
Joseph B. Dauda – Sierra Leonean Foreign Minister
Ali Rasso Dido – Member of the Kenyan National Assembly
Kayode Fayemi – Nigerian Cabinet Minister
Alan Ganoo – Speaker of the National Assembly of Mauritius
Roger Hawkins – Rhodesian Defence Minister
Omobola Johnson – Nigerian Cabinet Minister
Tamba Lamina – Sierra Leonean Cabinet Minister
David Nana Larbie – Ghanaian Member of Parliament
Francis Minah – Vice President of Sierra Leone
Ned Nwoko – Member of the Nigerian House of Representatives
Prince Chibudom Nwuche – Member of the Nigerian House of Representatives
George Nyamweya – Member of the Kenyan National Assembly
James Nyamweya – Kenyan Foreign Minister
Sam Okudzeto – Ghanaian Member of Parliament
Razack Peeroo – Speaker of the National Assembly of Mauritius
Chukwuemeka Ujam – Member of the Nigerian House of Representatives
Muhammad Uteem – Member of the Mauritian National Assembly
Justin Valentin – Seychellois Education Minister
Michael Kijana Wamalwa – Vice President of Kenya

Oceania
Sir Stanley Argyle – Premier of Victoria
Phillida Bunkle – Member of the New Zealand Parliament
Sir Ernest Clark – Governor of Tasmania
Sir John Cockburn – Premier of South Australia
Charles Henry Grant – Australian Member of Parliament
John Hargrave – Australian Member of Parliament and judge
Horace Harper – Australian Member of Parliament
Charles Beard Izard – Member of the New Zealand Parliament
James Purves – Member of the Victorian Legislative Assembly
Edward Wakefield – Member of the New Zealand Parliament
James Walker – Senator for New South Wales

Diplomatic service
Emmanuel Kodjoe Dadzie – Ghanaian diplomat
Francis Deng – Permanent Representative of South Sudan to the United Nations
Sir Francis Floud – British High Commissioner to Canada
Judith Gough – British Ambassador to Sweden
Peter Hayes – British High Commissioner to Sri Lanka
Victor Henderson – British Ambassador to Yemen
John Kittmer – British Ambassador to Greece
Dianna Melrose – British Ambassador to Cuba and British High Commissioner to Tanzania
Lawrence Middleton – British Ambassador to South Korea
Colin Munro – British Ambassador to Croatia
Archibald Rose – diplomat
Pjer Šimunović – Croatian Ambassador to the United States
Sir Edward Thornton – British Ambassador to the United States
Shekou Touray – Permanent Representative of Sierra Leone to the United Nations
John Tucknott – British Ambassador to Nepal
Lois Young – Permanent Representative of Belize to the United Nations

Royalty and nobility

Rowland Allanson-Winn, 5th Baron Headley – Irish peer
Princess Antonia, Duchess of Wellington – great-granddaughter of Wilhelm II, German Emperor and the wife of the Duke of Wellington
Princess Hajah Majeedah Nuurul Bulqiah – member of the Bruneian royal family
Princess Margarita of Baden – Member of the Yugoslav Royal Family
Prince Mateen of Brunei – member of the Bruneian royal family
John Boyle, 14th Earl of Cork – Irish peer
Roger Lambart, 13th Earl of Cavan – Irish peer
Napoléon, Prince Imperial – son of Emperor Napoleon III
Sheikh Khalid bin Sultan bin Zayed Al Nahyan – member of the Abu Dhabi royal family
Sheikh Meshal Abdullah Al-Jaber Al-Sabah – member of the Kuwaiti Royal Family
Rupert Onslow, 8th Earl of Onslow  – British peer
Prince Prisdang – member of the Thai royal family
Alexander Windsor, Earl of Ulster – 25th in line to the British Throne and heir to the Dukedom of Gloucester
Claire Windsor, Countess of Ulster – courtesy Countesses
Michael Evans-Freke, 12th Baron Carbery – Irish peer

Lawyers and judges

Judges

Kwadwo Agyei Agyapong – Ghanaian High Court judge
Geraldine Andrews – High Court Judge
Heather Williams – High Court Judge
Robin Auld – Lord Justice of Appeal
Horace Avory – Judge and criminal lawyer
Kofi Adumua Bossman – Justice of the Supreme Court of Ghana
Mackenzie Chalmers – Chief Justice of Gibraltar
Harry Dias Bandaranaike – Chief Justice of the Supreme Court of Ceylon
Louis Blom-Cooper – Judge and lawyer
Harold Bollers – Chief Justice of Guyana
William Brett, 1st Viscount Esher – Jusge and lawyer
Michael Caplan – Judge and solicitor
Bobbie Cheema-Grubb – High Court Judge
Fielding Clarke – Chief Justice of Fiji, Hong Kong and Jamaica
Edmund Davies, Baron Edmund-Davies – Lord Justice of Appeal and Law Lord
David Foskett – High Court judge
Cyril Fountain – Chief Justice of The Bahamas
David Foxton – High Court judge
Chukwunweike Idigbe – Justice of the Supreme Court of Nigeria
Neil Kaplan – Judge and arbitrator
Cecil Kelsick – Chief Justice of Trinidad and Tobago
Frances Kirkham – Judge
Leonard Knowles – Chief Justice of The Bahamas
Abdul Koroma – Judge of the International Court of Justice
Nthomeng Majara – Chief Justice of Lesotho
Wayne Martin – former Chief Justice of Western Australia
Walter Morgan – Chief Justice of Madras High Court
David Penry-Davey – High Court judge
Syed Shah Mohammed Quadri – Judge, Supreme Court of India (1997–2003) 
Sophon Ratanakorn – President of the Supreme Court of Thailand
Patrick Lipton Robinson – Judge of the International Court of Justice
Ilana Rovner – Judge
Jenny Rowe – Chief Executive of the Supreme Court of the United Kingdom
J. Sarkodee-Addo – Chief Justice of Ghana
Jaishanker Manilal Shelat – Justice, Supreme Court of India (1966–73)
Jeremy Sullivan – Senior President of Tribunals
John Taylor – Chief Justice of Lagos
Thomas Webb – Judge
Christopher Weeramantry – Vice-President of the International Court of Justice
James Wicks – Chief Justice of Kenya

Attorneys General

Michael Ashikodi Agbamuche – Nigerian Attorney General
Faris Al-Rawi – Trinidadian Attorney General
Lois Browne-Evans – Bermudan Attorney General
Francis Chang-Sam – Seychellois Attorney General
Marlene Malahoo Forte – Jamaican Attorney General
K. C. Kamalasabayson – Sri Lankan Attorney General
Trevor Moniz – Bermudan Attorney General
Michael Whitley – Singaporean Attorney General

Other lawyers

Rafiuddin Ahmed – Barrister
Brian Altman – Lead Counsel for the Independent Inquiry into Child Sexual Abuse
William Amiet – Barrister
Philippe Couvreur – Registrar at the International Court of Justice
Cormac Cullinan – Lawyer
John Eekelaar – Legal scholar
Michael Fox – Lawyer
Kevon Glickman – Entertainment Lawyer
Karim Ahmad Khan – Chief Prosecutor of the International Criminal Court
Aeneas James George Mackay – Lawyer
Amber Marks – Barrister
Peter McCormick – Lawyer
Mary O'Rourke – Barrister
William Soulsby – Barrister
Eulalie Spicer - lawyer and legal aid administrator, one of the most prominent divorce lawyers of her day
Tunji Sowande – First Black Head of a major UK barristers' chambers set
Joanna Toch – Barrister
John Uff – International arbitrator
I. Stephanie Boyce - First Black Office Holder and First Person of Colour President of the Law Society of England and Wales

Police and security specialists
Colin Cramphorn – Chief Constable of West Yorkshire Police
Richard A. Falkenrath – Deputy Commissioner of Counter-Terrorism of the New York City Police Department
Michael A. Levi – Senior Fellow at the Council on Foreign Relations
Maroof Raza – international security expert
Ayesha Siddiqa – military scientist
Paddy Tomkins – Police Chief Inspector
John Yates – Metropolitan Police head of counter-terrorism

Armed forces

Head of armed forces or a armed forces' service branch
Harsha Abeywickrama – former Commander of the Sri Lankan Air Force
Sohail Aman – Pakistani Chief of Air Staff
Sir Simon Bryant – Commander-in-Chief of RAF Air Command
Jayanath Colombage – Commander of the Sri Lankan Navy
Mel Hupfeld – Chief of Air Force of Royal Australian Air Force
Md Hashim bin Hussein – Chief of Army (Malaysia)
Mohammad Sharif Ibrahim – Commander of the Royal Brunei Air Force
Ola Ibrahim – Chief of the Defence Staff (Nigeria)
Pratap Chandra Lal – Commander & Chief of Air Staff
Sir Chris Moran – Commander-in-Chief of RAF Air Command
Neo Kian Hong – Chief of Defence Force (Singapore)
Peter Mbogo Njiru – Commander, Kenya Army
Sir Richard Peirse – Commander-in-Chief of the Indian Air Force and of RAF Bomber Command
Sir Tony Radakin – Chief of the Defence Staff
Hamzah Sahat – Commander of the Royal Brunei Armed Forces
Nishantha Ulugetenne – Commander of the Sri Lankan Navy
Sir Michael Wigston – Chief of the Air Staff
Martin Xuereb – Head of the Armed Forces of Malta

Other military officers
Edward Ahlgren – Commander Operations
Farid Ahmadi – Afghan army officer
A.T.M. Zahirul Alam – Force Commander of the United Nations Mission in Liberia
Tim Anderson – Director-General of the Military Aviation Authority
Simon Asquith – Royal Navy Commander Operations
Sir Stuart Atha – Air Officer Commanding No 1 Group
Hugh Beard – Controller of the Navy
Mark Sever Bell – recipient of the Victoria Cross
Sir Adrian Bradshaw – Deputy Supreme Allied Commander Europe
Bob Braham – World War II flying ace
Andrew Burns – Commander United Kingdom Maritime Forces
Hans Busk – army reformer
James Chiswell – General Officer Commanding the 1st Armoured Division
John Clink – Flag Officer Scotland, Northern England, Northern Ireland
Ben Connable – retired US Marine Major, Professor at the Frederick S. Pardee RAND Graduate School
Michael Conway – Director General of the Army Legal Services Branch
Paul Crespo – U.S. Marine captain
Peter Drissell – Commandant-General of the RAF Regiment
Sir Herbert Edwardes – army and political officer
Michael Elviss – British Army officer
Stanley Smyth Flower – army officer
Sir Robert Fry – Commandant General Royal Marines
Sir Wira Gardiner – soldier and public servant
Sir Richard Garwood – Deputy Commander-in-Chief Operations at RAF Air Command
Sir Frederic Goldsmid – Major-General, British Army
Dame Helen Gwynne-Vaughan – Commandant of the Women's Royal Air Force and Chief Controller of the Auxiliary Territorial Service
Sir Chris Harper – UK Military Representative to NATO and the EU
Michael Harwood – RAF Air Vice-Marshal
Syed Ata Hasnain – Indian Army General
Sir Nick Hine – Assistant Chief of the Naval Staff (Policy)
Matthew Holmes – Commandant General Royal Marines
Russell La Forte – Commander of the British Forces South Atlantic Islands
Mohammad Humayun Kabir – Force Commander of United Nations Peacekeeping Force in Cyprus
Ferdinand Le Quesne – recipient of the Victoria Cross
Suraya Marshall – Air Officer Commanding of No. 2 Group RAF
Dame Vera Laughton Mathews – Director of the Women's Royal Naval Service
Sir Simon Mayall – Middle East Adviser at the Ministry of Defence
James Morse – Controller of the Navy
Sir Barry North – Assistant Chief of the Air Staff
Richard Nugee – Defence Services Secretary
Sir Tim Radford – Deputy Supreme Allied Commander Europe
Javed Iqbal Ramday – President of the National Defence University, Pakistan
Pat Reid – army officer and author
Andy Salmon – Commandant General Royal Marines
Stuart Skeates – Commandant of the Royal Military Academy Sandhurst
Sir Arthur Sloggett – Director General Army Medical Services
Michael Smeath – RAF officer
Sir Graham Stacey – Deputy Commander, Allied Joint Force Command Brunssum
Simon Stuart – Australian Army officer
Robert Thomson – Commander of British Forces Cyprus
Rupert Thorneloe – Welsh Guards officer killed in action in Afghanistan
Garry Tunnicliffe – Defence Services Secretary
Tyrone Urch – General Officer Commanding Force Troops Command
David Walker – RAF Air Marshal
William Warrender – Flag Officer Sea Training

Academics

Heads of institutions

Robert Allison – Vice-Chancellor of Loughborough University
Harold Balme – President of Cheeloo University
Kenneth Barker – Vice-Chancellor of De Montfort University and Thames Valley University
Sir James Barrett – Vice-Chancellor of the University of Melbourne
Kenneth Dike – Vice-Chancellor of the University of Ibadan
Malcolm Gillies – Vice-Chancellor of City University, London and London Metropolitan University
Carl Gombrich – Co-founder and Academic Lead of The London Interdisciplinary School 
Devendra Prasad Gupta – Vice-Chancellor of Ranchi University
Sir Andrew Haines – Director of the London School of Hygiene & Tropical Medicine
Kenneth Hare – Master of Birkbeck College and President of the University of British Columbia
Kenneth Hill – Vice-Chancellor of the University of Benin, Nigeria
Kristín Ingólfsdóttir – Rector of the University of Iceland
Qasim Jan – Vice-Chancellor of the University of Peshawar, Sarhad University of Science and Information Technology and Quaid-i-Azam University
George Kitchin – Vice-Chancellor of the University of Durham
Sedat Laçiner – Rector of Çanakkale Onsekiz Mart University
Sir Alec Merrison – Vice-Chancellor of the University of Bristol
David Petley – Vice-Chancellor of the University of Hull
Barney Pityana – Vice-Chancellor of the University of South Africa
Sir Joseph Pope – Vice-Chancellor of Aston University
Bernadette Porter – Vice-Chancellor of the University of Roehampton
Dame Alison Richard – Vice-Chancellor of the University of Cambridge
Dame Janet Ritterman – Director of the Royal College of Music and Chancellor of Middlesex University
Sir Frederick Robertson – Vice-Chancellor of the Punjab University
Dame Nancy Rothwell – President of the University of Manchester
Sir Anthony Seldon – Vice-Chancellor of the University of Buckingham and Tony Blair's biographer
John Spinks – President of the University of Saskatchewan
Francis Stock – Vice-Chancellor of the University of Natal
Robert Street – Vice-Chancellor of the University of Western Australia
Sir Richard Sykes – Rector of Imperial College London and Chairman of GlaxoSmithKline
Chris Taylor – Vice-Chancellor of the University of Bradford
Henry Wace – Principal of King's College London
Rob Warner – Vice-Chancellor of Plymouth Marjon University
Paul Wellings – Vice-Chancellor of the University of Lancaster and the University of Wollongong
Steven West – Vice-Chancellor of the University of the West of England
Anne Wright – Vice-Chancellor of the University of Sunderland

Historians
John Romilly Allen – archaeologist
Ali Ansari – Professor of Modern History with reference to the Middle East at the University of St Andrews
Sir Raymond Beazley – historian
Matthew Bennett – historian
Brian Bond – military historian
Alfred John Church – classical scholar
Sir William Laird Clowes – naval historian
Sebastian Cox – RAF historian
Paul Davis – military historian
Richard MacGillivray Dawkins – archaeologist
Katherine Elizabeth Fleming – historian
Ian Gooderson – military historian
Andrew Gordon – naval historian
Judith Green – medieval historian
Mark Grimsley – historian
Eric Grove – naval historian
Richard Grunberger – historian
D. G. E. Hall – historian
Christopher Harper-Bill – historian
Dorothy King – archaeologist
Robert Knecht – historian
Amélie Kuhrt – historian
Andrew Lambert – naval historian
Marc Morris – historian
Percy Newberry – Egyptologist
Peter Paret – historian
Philip Sabin – military historian
Gary Sheffield – military historian
Anne Somerset – historian
Geoffrey Till – naval historian
Colin White – Director of the Royal Naval Museum
Donald Wiseman – archaeologist
Fern Riddell – cultural historian

Theologians
E. W. Bullinger – dispensationalist theologian
Julius J. Lipner – Hindu scholar
Eric J. Lott – religious scholar
Ralph Martin – New Testament scholar
Peter Medd – priest and scholar
Cris Rogers – theologian
Henry Barclay Swete – biblical scholar
Sidney Thelwall – Christian scholar
Anthony Thiselton – theologian
Evelyn Underhill – theologian
Peter Vardy – theologian and philosopher
Ralph Waller – theologian
Robin Ward – Principal of St Stephen's House, Oxford

Others

Edgar Thurston – Lecturer at Madras Medical College
Helen Beebee – philosopher
Robert Lubbock Bensly – orientalist
Jo Boaler – mathematics professor at Stanford University
Nick Bostrom – philosopher
Ahron Bregman – political scientist
Harry Brighouse – political philosopher
Matthew Bryden – political analyst
Arthur Coke Burnell – translator
Elizabeth Burns – philosopher
Robert Caldwell – Master of Corpus Christi College, Cambridge
Raymond Cattell – psychologist
Alexander Coker – UN chemical weapons inspector
Josh Cooper – cryptographer
Karen Cox – Deputy Vice Chancellor University of Nottingham
Brian Davies – philosopher
Sir Ian Gainsford – Vice-Principal of King's College London
Sir Francis Galton – polymath
Clara Knight – classicist
Francisco Javier Carrillo Gamboa – economist
Rosemary Hollis – political scientist
Sir John Maddox – editor of Nature
Joseph Shield Nicholson – economist
Wendy Piatt – Director General of The Russell Group
Eleanor Plumer – Principal of St Anne's College, Oxford
Stathis Psillos – philosopher of science
John Thomas Quekett – microscopist and histologist
Fiona Ross – nursing scholar
Lucinda Roy – literary scholar
Frederick Rushmore – Master of St Catharine's College, Cambridge
Dan Sarooshi – legal scholar
Yezid Sayigh – Middle East scholar
Winston Wole Soboyejo – mechanical and aerospace engineer
Muthucumaraswamy Sornarajah – legal scholar
John Tooze – scientific administrator
Nicla Vassallo – philosopher
Sir Ralph Wedgwood, 4th Baronet – philosopher
Edward William West – orientalist
Karl Pearson – Deputy Professor of Mathematics

Scientists

Biologists

 
Denis Alexander – molecular biologist and theologian
Eric Barnard – neuroscientist
Angus John Bateman – geneticist
Lionel Smith Beale – physician
Thomas Cavalier-Smith – Professor of Evolutionary Biology at the University of Oxford
Qui-Lim Choo – co-discoverer of Hepatitis C and of the Hepatitis D genome
Keith Campbell – led team that cloned Dolly the sheep
Sir Howard Dalton – microbiologist
Michael Denton – biochemist and author
Sir Jack Drummond – biochemist
R. John Ellis – Gairdner Foundation International Award winning biochemist
Charles Edmund Ford – cytogeneticist
Christine Foyer – biologist
Nicholas Franks – biophysicist
Raymond Gosling – DNA researcher
Keith Gull – microbiologist
Hugh Gurling – geneticist
Jean Hanson – biophysicist and zoologist
Denis Haydon – membrane biophysicist
Edward Hindle – biologist
Christine Holt – neuroscientist
Rob Horne – physician
Sir Michael Houghton – 2020 Nobel Prize in Physiology or Medicine laureate and co-discoverer of Hepatitis C and of the Hepatitis D genome
John Hughes – Lasker Award winning neuroscientist
Charles Leonard Huskins – geneticist
Alwyn Jones – biophysicist
Andrew King – neurophysiologist
Michael Levitt – 2013 Nobel Prize in Chemistry laureate and Professor of Structural Biology at Stanford University
Joel Mandelstam – microbiologist
St. George Jackson Mivart – biologist
Noreen Murray – molecular geneticist who helped develop a vaccine against Hepatitis B
John Newton – epidemiologist
Anthony Pawson – Kyoto Prize laureate
Sir Rudolph Peters – biochemist
Rohan Pethiyagoda – taxonomist
Sir Andrew Pollard – Chief Investigator on the Oxford–AstraZeneca COVID-19 vaccine
Sheila Rodwell – nutritional epidemiologist
Steven Rose – biologist and neurobiologist
Helen Saibil – biologist
William Saville-Kent – marine biologist
Nigel Scrutton – biochemist
Robert Malcolm Simmons – Director of the Randall Division of Cell and Molecular Biophysics
Stephen Simpson – biologist
Audrey Smith – cryobiologist
Bruce Stocker – microbiologist
David Stuart – structural biologist
Sylvia Agnes Sophia Tait – biochemist and endocrinologist
Dame Janet Thornton – Director of the European Bioinformatics Institute
Sir Graham Wilson – bacteriologist
Lewis Wolpert – developmental biologist

Botanists
David Bellamy – botanist
Robert Bentley – botanist
David Catcheside – plant geneticist
Sydney Harland – botanist
Eric John Hewitt – plant physiologist
Maxwell Masters – botanist
Daphne Osborne – botanist

Computer scientists
Steve Bourne – computer scientist
Ian H. S. Cullimore – computer scientist
Darren Dalcher – computer scientist
Luciano da Fontoura Costa- professor, Multidisciplinary Computing Group, Institute of Physics, São Carlos, University of São Paulo
Hassan Ugail – computer scientist

Chemists
Michael Barnett – theoretical chemist
William Boon – chemist
John Eddowes Bowman the Younger – chemist
Philip Bunker – Canadian scientist and author
Sir John Cadogan – President of the Royal Society of Chemistry
Sir Arthur Herbert Church – chemist
Leslie Crombie – chemist
Charles Frederick Cross – chemist
Richard Dixon – chemist
Sir Arthur Duckham – President of the Institution of Chemical Engineers
Henry John Horstman Fenton – chemist
Victor Gold – chemist
Leticia González – chemist
Sir Herbert Jackson – chemist
Mumtaz Ali Kazi – President of the Pakistan Academy of Sciences
Augustine Ong – chemist
Geoffrey Ozin – chemist
Raymond Peters – chemist
Eric Scerri – chemist
Sir Jocelyn Field Thorpe – chemist

Earth scientists
George Barrow – geologist
Henry William Bristow – geologist
David Edgar Cartwright – oceanographer
Sir George Deacon – oceanographer
Archibald Thomas John Dollar – geologist and seismologist
David Lary – atmospheric scientist
David Linton – geographer
John Milne – inventor of the Seismometer
Ukichiro Nakaya – glaciologist
David Potts – geotechnical engineer
Sir Arthur Russell, 6th Baronet – mineralogist
Harry Bolton Seed – geotechnical engineer
Sir Laurence Dudley Stamp – geographer and President of the Royal Geographical Society
James Haward Taylor – President of the Mineralogical Society of Great Britain and Ireland
Errol White – geologist and President of the Linnean Society of London
Sidney Wooldridge – geologist and President of the Royal Geographical Society

Medicine
 

Theodore Dyke Acland – surgeon and physician
Francis Anstie – physician
Eric Anson – anaesthetist
Norman Ashton – ophthalmologist
Simon Baron-Cohen – Director of the Autism Research Centre at the University of Cambridge
Evan Buchanan Baxter – physician
Dinesh Bhugra – President of the Royal College of Psychiatrists
John Bienenstock – physician
Sir William Bowman, 1st Baronet – histologist and anatomist
Peter Brinsden – gynaecologist
William Brinton – physician
Russell Brock, Baron Brock – pioneer of modern open-heart surgery
Thomas Gregor Brodie – physiologist
Michael Burgess – coroner
Geoffrey Burnstock – medical researcher
Dame Jill Macleod Clark – nursing administrator
Dame Jessica Corner – nurse
Edgar Crookshank – physician and microbiologist
William Broughton Davies – doctor
John Leonard Dawson – Serjeant Surgeon to the Royal Household
Sir Richard Doll – Shaw Prize laureate
Annette Dolphin – pharmacologist
Victor Dzau – President of Duke University Hospital
Havelock Ellis – physician, sexual psychologist and social reformer
Dame Uta Frith – developmental psychologist
Abraham Pineo Gesner – inventor of kerosene and physician
Ben Goldacre – physician
James Goolnik – dentist
Sir James Gowans – Wolf Prize in Medicine laureate
Austin Gresham – pathologist
Christopher Heath – surgeon
Douglas Higgs – haematologist
John Hilton – surgeon
Thomas Hodgkin – pathologist and discoverer of Hodgkin's lymphoma
Sir Frederick Hopkins – 1929 Nobel Prize in Physiology or Medicine laureate and President of the Royal Society
Richard Houlston – Professor of Molecular genetics and Population genetics at the Institute of Cancer Research
Joseph Graeme Humble – haematologist
Thomas Inman – surgeon
Sir George Johnson – physician
Takaki Kanehiro – discoverer of the link between beriberi and diet
David Kemp – audiologist
Raymond Kirk – surgeon
Paul Knapman – coroner
Marios Kyriazis – gerontologist
Sir Morell Mackenzie – physician
Sir Charles James Martin – Director of the Lister Institute
Harold Moody – physician
Ludlow Moody – physician
Sir Victor Negus – surgeon
Edward Nettleship – ophthalmologist
John Graham Nicholls – physiologist
Sir John Peel – gynecologist
Lionel Penrose – psychiatrist and geneticist
William D. Richardson – Director of the UCL Wolfson Institute
Geoffrey Rose – ophthalmologist
Dame Cicely Saunders – founder of modern hospice philosophy
Ulrike Schmidt – psychiatrist
Sir John Simon – Chief Medical Officer for HM Government
Patrick Steptoe – pioneer of IVF who missed out on a Nobel Prize because he died before the awarding
Sir George Adlington Syme – surgeon
Thomas Pridgin Teale – surgeon and ophthalmologist
Max Theiler – 1951 Nobel Prize in Physiology or Medicine laureate for developing a vaccine against yellow fever
Sir St Clair Thomson – surgeon
Sir Cecil Wakeley, 1st Baronet – surgeon
Fredric Wertham – psychiatrist
Edith Whetnall – surgeon
Elsie Widdowson – dietitian
Fiona Wood – plastic surgeon
Anthony Yates – rheumatologist
Sir R. A. Young – physician

Nurses
Florence Nightingale – established the first official nurses' training programme Nightingale School for Nurses, the founder of modern nursing
Cicely Saunders – established the first modern hospice St Christopher's Hospice, pioneer of palliative care
Sir Jonathan Asbridge – first president of the UK's Nursing and Midwifery Council and director of Nursing NHS London
Alice Fisher – nursing pioneer in the US at the Philadelphia General Hospital
Lucy Osburn – regarded as the founder of modern nursing in Australia
Emmy Rappe – founded the Swedish Nursing Association
Linda Richards – first professionally trained American nurse, a pioneer of individual patients' medical records and established programmes in US and Japan
Isla Stewart, became the matron of St Bartholomew's Hospital and founded the Royal British Nurses Association
Henny Tscherning – became president of the Danish Nurses' Organization
Theodora Turner  – nurse superintendent of St Thomas' Hospital (during reconstruction after the Blitz), became president of Royal College of Nursing
Kofoworola Abeni Pratt – became Chief Nursing Officer of Nigeria

Physicists and astronomers

Ronald Burge – physicist
Leigh Canham – optoelectronics physicist
Eva Crane – mathematician and physicist who became world expert on bees
Andrew Fabian – President of the Royal Astronomical Society
Frank Farmer – physicist
Michael Fisher – Wolf Prize in Physics laureate
Marcelo Gleiser – physicist and astronomer
Peter Higgs – proposer of the Higgs boson and 2013 Nobel Prize in Physics laureate
 Basil Hiley – Bohmian quantum physicist
Francis Jones – physicist
Claudio Maccone – space scientist
Donald MacCrimmon MacKay – physicist
Edward Walter Maunder – astronomer
John Edwin Midwinter – President of the Institution of Electrical Engineers
William Allen Miller – astronomer and chemist
John Robert Mills – radar pioneer
Ali Moustafa Mosharafa – theoretical physicist
Raja Ramanna – physicist
Simon Saunders – philosopher of physics
Edward James Stone – President of the Royal Astronomical Society
Louis Slotin – nuclear physicist who took part to the Manhattan Project
Boris Townsend – physicist
Kumar Wickramasinghe – electrical engineer

Zoologists
Hilda Margaret Bruce – zoologist
Peter Martin Duncan – palaeontologist
Alfred Henry Garrod – vertebrate zoologist
Frederick Hutton – zoologist
Janet Kear – ornithologist
Dame Miriam Rothschild – zoologist and entomologist
Adam Sedgwick – zoologist
Robert Walter Campbell Shelford – entomologist
Sir Eric Smith – zoologist
Henry Tibbats Stainton – entomologist
Thomas Stebbing – zoologist

Mathematicians
David Acheson – mathematician
Colin Bushnell – mathematician
Keith Devlin – mathematician
Graham Everest – mathematician
Aubrey William Ingleton – mathematician
Leon Mirsky – mathematician
Sir Martin Taylor – mathematician
Henry William Watson – mathematician
Tom Willmore – geometer

Religion

Archbishops & Primates

Joseph Abiodun Adetiloye – Primate of Nigeria
Richard Clarke – Archbishop of Armagh and Primate of All Ireland
Joost de Blank – Archbishop of Cape Town
John Holder – Archbishop of the West Indies
Churchill Julius – Archbishop of New Zealand
Ted Luscombe – Primus of the Scottish Episcopal Church
Tom Morgan – Archbishop of Saskatoon
Njongonkulu Ndungane – Archbishop of Cape Town
Berhaneyesus Demerew Souraphiel – Catholic cardinal and Archbishop of Addis Abeba
Desmond Tutu – Archbishop of Cape Town and 1984 Nobel Peace Prize laureate

Bishops

Cyril Abeynaike – Bishop of Colombo
James Adams – Bishop of Barking
Gabriel Akinbolarin Akinbiyi – Bishop of Offa and Akoko
D. J. Ambalavanar – Bishop of Jaffna
Godfrey Ashby – Bishop of St John's
David Atkinson – Bishop of Thetford
Harold Beardmore – Bishop of St Helena
Paul Barnett – Bishop of North Sydney
Hibbert Binney – Bishop of Nova Scotia
Richard Blunt – Bishop of Hull
Derek Bond – Bishop of Bradwell
David Bonser – Bishop of Bolton
Christopher Boyle – Bishop of Northern Malawi
Harold Bradfield – Bishop of Bath and Wells
John Broadhurst – Bishop of Fulham
Michael Campbell – Bishop of Lancaster
Edward Cannan – Bishop of St Helena
Noel Chamberlain – Bishop of Trinidad and Tobago
Richard Cheetham – Bishop of Kingston upon Thames
Peter Coleman – Bishop of Crediton
Eric Cordingly – Bishop of Thetford
Frederick Courtney – Bishop of Nova Scotia
Frederick Craske – Bishop of Gibraltar
Anthony Crockett – Bishop of Bangor
Richard Cutts – Bishop of Argentina and Eastern South America
Anne Dyer – Bishop of Aberdeen and Orkney
Peter Eaton – Bishop of Southeast Florida
Philip Egan – Bishop of Portsmouth
Tim Ellis – Bishop of Grantham
Ghislain Emmanuel – Bishop of Mauritius
Ralph Emmerson – Bishop of Knaresborough
Graham Foley – Bishop of Reading
Richard Garrard – Bishop of Penrith
Hugh Gilbert – Bishop of Aberdeen
William Godfrey – Bishop of Peru and Uruguay
Laurie Green – Bishop of Bradwell
Sehon Goodridge – Bishop of the Windward Islands
David Halsey – Bishop of Carlisle & Tonbridge
Mike Harrison – Bishop of Dunwich
Peter Hatendi – Bishop of Mashonaland
Sir Christopher Hill – Bishop of Guildford
Edward Holland – Bishop of Gibraltar & Colchester
Alan Hopes – Bishop of East Anglia
John Hudson – Bishop of Carpentaria
Peter Hullah – Bishop of Ramsbury
Henry Huxtable – Bishop of Mauritius
Martyn Jarrett – Bishop of Beverley
David Jennings – Bishop of Warrington
Akinpelu Johnson – Bishop of Lagos Mainland
Graeme Knowles – Bishop of Sodor and Man and Dean of St Paul's
Richard Lewis – Bishop of Taunton & St Edmundsbury and Ipswich
Christopher Lowson – Bishop of Lincoln
Francis McDougall – Bishop of Labuan and Sarawak
Lloyd Morrell – Bishop of Lewes
Theo Naledi – Bishop of Botswana and Matabeleland
Keith Newton – Bishop of Richborough
John Neale – Bishop of Ramsbury
Jack Nicholls – Bishop of Sheffield & Lancaster
Ivor Norris – Bishop of Brandon
Stephen Oliver – Bishop of Stepney
Kenneth Oram – Bishop of Grahamstown
Geoffrey Paul – Bishop of Bradford & Hull
Andrew Proud – Bishop of Reading
Gavin Reid – Bishop of Maidstone
Alan Rogers – Bishop of Mauritius, Fulham & Colchester
David Rossdale – Bishop of Grimsby
Andrew Rumsey – Bishop of Ramsbury
Roy Screech – Bishop of St Germans
Peter Selby – Bishop of Kingston and Worcester
Ronald Shapley – Bishop of the Windward Islands
Martin Shaw – Bishop of Argyll and the Isles
Ronald Shepherd – Bishop of British Columbia
David Smith – Bishop of Bradford & Maidstone
Mark Sowerby – Bishop of Horsham
Robert Springett – Bishop of Tewkesbury
Frederic Stanford – Bishop of Cariboo
John Strachan – Bishop of Rangoon
Eric Treacy – Bishop of Wakefield & Pontefract
John Trillo – Bishop of Bedford, Chelmsford & Hertford
Clayton Twitchell – Bishop of Polynesia
Dominic Walker – Bishop of Monmouth
Ambrose Weekes – Bishop of Gibraltar
Rob Wickham – Bishop of Edmonton
Edward Wilkinson – Bishop of Zululand and Europe
Martin Wallace – Bishop of Selby

Archdeacons

Geoffrey Arrand – Archdeacon of Suffolk
Simon Baker – Archdeacon of Lichfield
Frank Bentley – Archdeacon of Worcester
Thomas Browne – Archdeacon of Ipswich
Michael Bucks – Chaplain of the Fleet
Roger Bush – Archdeacon of Cornwall
Mark Butchers – Archdeacon of Barnstaple
Ian Chandler – Archdeacon of Plymouth
Jesse Clayson – Archdeacon of Croydon
Roger Combes – Archdeacon of Horsham
Peter Delaney – Archdeacon of London
Andrew Doughty – Archdeacon of Bermuda
Michael Everitt – Archdeacon of Lancaster
Christopher Futcher – Archdeacon of Exeter
Paul Gardner – Archdeacon of Exeter
Ian Gatford – Archdeacon of Derby
Malcolm Grundy – Archdeacon of Craven
Armstrong Hall – Archdeacon of Richmond
Michael Harley – Archdeacon of Winchester
Alun Hawkins – Archdeacon of Bangor
John Hawkins – Archdeacon of Hampstead
John Hawley – Archdeacon of Blackburn
Bob Jeffery – Archdeacon of Salop, Dean of Worcester
David Jenkins – Archdeacon of Westmorland and Furness
Clifford Lacey – Archdeacon of Lewisham
Rosemary Lain-Priestley – Archdeacon for the Two Cities
Giles Legood – Chaplain-in-Chief of the Royal Air Force
Peter Lock – Archdeacon of Rochester
Leonard Moss – Archdeacon of Hereford
Michael Nott – Archdeacon of Maidstone & Canterbury
Niel Nye – Archdeacon of Maidstone
Mark Oakley – Archdeacon of Germany and Northern Europe
John Perumbalath – Archdeacon of Barking
Arnold Picton – Archdeacon of Blackburn
Charles Pinder – Archdeacon of Lambeth
William Prior – Archdeacon of Bodmin
John Rawlings – Archdeacon of Totnes
John Reed – Archdeacon of Taunton
Stephen Roberts – Archdeacon of Wandsworth
Harry Saunders – Archdeacon of Macclesfield
David Sharples – Archdeacon of Salford
Ernest Henry Shears – Archdeacon of Durban
Benjamin Smith – Archdeacon of Maidstone
Jonathan Smith – Archdeacon of St Albans
Roy Southwell – Archdeacon of Northolt
David Sutch – Archdeacon of Gibraltar
Edward Taylor – Archdeacon of Warwick
Charles Tonks – Archdeacon of Croydon
Robin Turner – Chaplain-in-Chief of the Royal Air Force
David Waller – Archdeacon of Gibraltar, Italy and Malta
Henry Watkins – Archdeacon of Durham, Northumberland and Auckland
Alfred Wright – Archdeacon of Waimea
Paul Wright – Archdeacon of Bromley & Bexley

Deans

Francis Austin – Dean of St George's Cathedral, Georgetown
Stuart Babbage – Dean of Sydney and Dean of Melbourne
Grahame Baker – Dean of Ontario
Roy Barker – Dean of Grahamstown
Mark Beach – Dean of Rochester
Trevor Beeson – Dean of Winchester
David Brindley – Dean of Portsmouth
Edward Carpenter – Dean of Westminster
Philip Cecil – Dean of Belize
Michael Chandler – Dean of Ely
Clifford Chapman – Dean of Exeter
Neil Collings – Dean of St Edmundsbury
Adrian Dorber – Dean of Lichfield
Frederick Cogman – Dean of Guernsey
Frederic Farrar – Dean of Canterbury and Master of Marlborough College
Gerald Field – Dean of Cashel
Dianna Gwilliams – Dean of Guildford
Frederic Harton – Dean of Wells
Joe Hawes – Dean of St Edmundsbury
Philip Hesketh – Dean of Rochester
David Ison – Dean of St Paul's
Trevor James – Dean of Dunedin
Walter Jenks – Dean of Moray, Ross and Caithness
Martin Kitchen – Dean of Derby
Marcus Knight – Dean of Exeter
John Lang – Dean of Lichfield
Walter Matthews – Dean of St Paul's
George Nairn-Briggs – Dean of Wakefield
Martyn Percy – Dean of Christ Church
Ken Robinson – Dean of Gibraltar
Ronald Sargison – Dean of St George's Cathedral, Georgetown
Paul Shackerley – Dean of Brecon
Colin Slee – Dean of Southwark
Rowan Smith – Dean of Cape Town
Victor Stock – Dean of Guildford
Michael Tavinor – Dean of Hereford
Lister Tonge – Dean of Monmouth
John Wattie – Dean of Aberdeen and Orkney
Michael Webber – Dean of Hobart
Jeremy Winston – Dean of Monmouth

Other religious figures
Heidi Baker – Christian missionary
Muhammad Abdul Bari – Secretary General of the Muslim Council of Britain
Shaw Clifton – General of The Salvation Army
Richard Coles – priest, musician and journalist
Leonard Coulshaw – Chaplain of the Fleet
Frank Curtis – Provost of Sheffield
Thomas Pelham Dale – Ritualist clergyman
Rob Frost – Methodist evangelist
Robert Gandell – biblical scholar
Donald Clifford Gray – clergyman
Walter Homolka – rabbi
Donald Howard – Provost of St Andrew's Cathedral, Aberdeen
Lawrence Jackson – Provost of Blackburn
Eric James – Chaplain Extraordinary to HM the Queen
George Jack Kinnell – Provost of St Andrew's Cathedral, Aberdeen
Kenneth Leech – priest
Peter Mallett – Chaplain-General to the Forces
Stephen Need – religious author and former Dean of St. George's College, Jerusalem
Hugh Smith – Chaplain-General of Prisons
Frederick Spurrell – priest and archaeologist
Michael Volland – Principal of Ridley Hall, Cambridge

Arts and media

Authors

Dannie Abse – writer and poet
John Adair – author
Alfred Ainger – biographer and critic
Lyman Andrews – poet
Sir Edwin Arnold – poet and journalist
William Beal – religious writer
Stephen Benatar – author
Ronan Bennett – novelist and screenwriter
Tamasin Berry-Hart – novelist
Sir Walter Besant – novelist, historian and academic
Shahbano Bilgrami – novelist and poet
Alain de Botton – writer, philosopher and television producer
Patrick Braybrooke – literary critic
Paula Broadwell – biographer of David Petraeus
Charles Brookfield – playwright and actor
Anita Brookner – Booker Prize-winning novelist
Sir Arthur C. Clarke – science fiction writer and inventor
Helen Cresswell – children's author and screenwriter
Quentin Crisp – writer
Sir George Webbe Dasent – writer
Mike Dash – writer and journalist
Ebou Dibba – novelist
Alison Dolling – writer
Jane Draycott – poet
Maureen Duffy – novelist, poet and screenwriter
Andreas Embirikos – poet
Charles Finger – author
C. S. Forester – historical novelist
John Fraser – novelist and poet
Chris Genoa – comedic novelist
Sir W. S. Gilbert – one half of Gilbert and Sullivan.
Tariq Goddard – novelist
Bea Gonzalez – novelist and lecturer
Bill Griffiths – poet
Radclyffe Hall – poet and author
Thomas Hardy – novelist and poet.
Constance Heaven – novelist and actress
Dame Susan Hill – novelist
Eileen Hayes – author, columnist
Molly Holden – poet
Africanus Horton – writer
Susan Howatch – author
Simon Ings – novelist
Christopher Isherwood – novelist
Storm Jameson – novelist
B. S. Johnson – novelist
Nihan Kaya – novelist
John Keats – Romantic poet.
Garry Kilworth – novelist
Charles Kingsley – novelist
Henry Kingsley – novelist
Hanif Kureishi – Whitbread Award-winning author and screenwriter
Katherine Langrish – author
Molly Lefebure – writer
Marina Lewycka – novelist
Thomas Macknight – biographer
Sabrina Mahfouz – poet and playwright
Menon Marath – novelist
Alexander Masters – Whitbread Award-winning author and screenwriter
W. Somerset Maugham – novelist and playwright
Ronald Brunlees McKerrow – Shakespearean biographer
James Miller – novelist
Henry Morley – writer and academic
Sir Michael Morpurgo – writer
Desidério Murcho – writer
Lawrence Norfolk – novelist
Kathleen Nott – novelist and poet
Ann Pilling – author and poet
Barry Pilton – novelist and screenwriter
Ross Raisin – novelist
Vernon Richards – anarchist editor and author
Anne Ridler – poet
Michael Roberts – poet, writer and broadcaster
John Ruskin – author, poet, artist, art critic and social critic
John Ralston Saul – writer
Frederick George Scott – poet
Anne Sebba – writer
Khushwant Singh – writer and Member of the Indian Rajya Sabha
Elizabeth Smart – novelist and poet
Jon Hunter Spence – Jane Austen scholar
John Stammers – poet and writer
Sir Leslie Stephen – author and mountaineer
Robin Stevens – children's author
Rosemary Timperley – novelist
Frederick Augustus Voigt – writer
David Watmough – novelist, playwright and academic
Michael White – writer
Virginia Woolf – novelist and essayist

Media, entertainment, film and theatre

Adewale Akinnuoye-Agbaje – actor
Andrew Alexander – actor
Sheila Atim – actress
Juliet Aubrey – actress
Michael Barry – BBC executive
Emily Berrington – actress
Georgina Bouzova – actress
Rory Bremner – impressionist
Herbert Brenon – film director
Sue Carpenter – television presenter
Nazrin Choudhury – screenwriter
Bijan Daneshmand – actor and film director
Gregory de Polnay – actor
Leonard Fenton – actor
Graeme Garden – actor and comedian
Greer Garson – actress
Sacha Gervasi – screenwriter
Edmund Gwenn – actor
Janice Hadlow – Controller of BBC Two
Jason Hall – playwright
Aiysha Hart – actress
Sean Holmes – theatre director
Sir Barry Ife – Principal of Guildhall School of Music and Drama
Derek Jarman – film director
Boris Karloff – actor
Henry Kemble – actor
Ella Marchment – opera director
Jamila Massey – actress
Jez Nelson – broadcaster
Sir Allan Powell – Chairman of the BBC (1939–1946)
Clifford Rose – actor
Tom Rosenthal – actor and comedian
Ashraf Safdar – actor and journalist
Banita Sandhu – Bollywood actress
Darwin Shaw – actor
Ceri Sherlock – Welsh theatre and film director
Robert J. Sherman – American theatre songwriter
Jane Tranter – BBC executive
Bree Turner – actress
Sir Charles Wyndham – actor

Journalists

Editors
Christian Broughton – editor of The Independent
Cyril Kenneth Bird – editor of Punch and cartoonist
John Delane – editor of The Times
Sydney Jacobson, Baron Jacobson – editor of The Sun
Baxter Langley – editor of the Morning Star
Hargreaves Parkinson – editor of The Financial Times
Farrah Storr – editor of Cosmopolitan (UK)

Other journalists
Antoine Allen – ITV News reporter
Anita Anand – journalist
Ruaridh Arrow – journalist and film maker
Martin Bashir – journalist
Lisa Brennan-Jobs – journalist, daughter of Steve Jobs
Sana Bucha – journalist & anchor
David Bond – sports journalist
Michael Bukht – radio executive
Benjamin Cohen – Channel 4 News correspondent
Jane Corbin – BBC Panorama journalist
Charlet Duboc — journalist
Ayesha Durgahee — journalist
Gwynne Dyer – journalist and military historian
Sean Fletcher – journalist
Daniel Ford – journalist, novelist and military historian
Matthew Halton – journalist
Ellie Harrison – BBC journalist
Georgina Henry – journalist
George Hills – journalist
Cecil Hunt – journalist
Francine Lacqua – Bloomberg Television anchor
Sophie Long – BBC News journalist
Diana Magnay – Sky News journalist
Jonathan Maitland – journalist
Ira Mathur – journalist
Chapman Pincher – journalist
Claire Rayner – journalist and agony aunt
Tom Rogan – journalist
Roger Royle – radio broadcaster
John Sandes – journalist and author
Nicholas Stuart – journalist

Musicians

Filiz Ali – pianist and musicologist
DJ Cuppy – Forbes-listed, award-winning musician and DJ
Peter Asher – musician and record producer
Sir Harrison Birtwistle – composer
Fiona Brice – violinist
Ming Bridges – singer
David Bruce – composer
Steven Burke – video game music composer and sound designer
John Deacon – bassist for the rock band Queen
Francesco Cilluffo – conductor and composer
Suzannah Clark – Professor of Music at Harvard University
Suzi Digby – conductor and musician
Anne Dudley – Oscar-winning composer
John Evan – keyboardist for Jethro Tull
David Fallows – musicologist
Harold Fraser-Simson – composer
Dai Fujikura – composer
Sir John Eliot Gardiner – conductor
JB Gill – singer with British boyband JLS, now a farmer and broadcaster
Raja Kashif – singer
Daniel Leech-Wilkinson – musicologist
Levina – singer
Simon Lole – musician
Andy Mackay – saxophonist for Roxy Music
Davitt Moroney – musicologist, harpsichordist and organist
Alice Martineau – singer and songwriter
John Moran – musician and musicologist
Mixmaster Morris – DJ
Chris Newman – composer
Michael Nyman – composer and musicologist
Kele Okereke – Bloc Party vocalist and guitarist
Roger Parker – musicologist
John Porter – record producer
Surendran Reddy – composer and pianist
Jean-Baptiste Robin – composer and organist
Adnan Sami – musician
David Satian – composer
Andrew Schultz – composer
Shanon Shah – singer
Gilli Smyth – musician who performed with Gong amongst others
Jeremy Summerly – conductor
Dobrinka Tabakova – composer
Howard Talbot – composer and conductor
 Jeffrey Tate – conductor
Jeremy Thurlow – composer
Edward Top – composer
Errollyn Wallen – composer
Billy Werner – singer and songwriter
Yiruma – pianist
Justin Hayward Young – lead singer of The Vaccines

Artists and photographers
Pegaret Anthony – watercolourist
Vanessa Bell – painter
Albert Bruce-Joy – sculptor
Joseph Crawhall III – artist
Tristram Ellis – painter
Peter Henry Emerson – photographer
Cyril Wiseman Herbert – painter
Ross McNicol – photographer
Ronald Moody – sculptor
Richard Mosse – photographer
Robyn O'Neil – artist
Angela Verren – artist
Moritz Waldemeyer – technical designer
Sophia Wellbeloved – artist

Business and economics

Company founders
Rakesh Aggarwal – entrepreneur and founder of Escentual.com
Walter Owen Bentley – founder of Bentley Motors
Christian Candy – businessman (real estate) and founder of Candy & Candy
William Foyle – founder of Foyles bookshop
Sam Instone – businessman and founder of AES International
Klaus Heymann – entrepreneur and founder of Naxos Records
Sir Alliott Verdon Roe – founder of Avro
Daniel Schreiber – CEO and co-founder of Lemonade, Inc.
Naveen Selvadurai – co-founder of Foursquare
Stephen Streater – founder of Eidos
Sir David Tang – businessman and founder of Shanghai Tang fashion chain

CEOs and business people
Alex Beard – Chief Executive of the Royal Opera House
Harriet Green – CEO of Thomas Cook Group
Calouste Gulbenkian – oil magnate and philanthropist
Eurfyl ap Gwilym – Deputy Chairman of the Principality Building Society and Plaid Cymru politician
Omar Ishrak – Chairman & CEO of Medtronic
Sir Deryck Maughan – CEO of Salomon Brothers
Steve Mogford – CEO of United Utilities
Eric Nicoli – CEO of EMI
Sir Ronald Norman – businessman
Nneka Onyeali-Ikpe – CEO of Fidelity Bank Nigeria
Sir Edward Packard – Chairman of Fisons
Tim Pryce – CEO of Terra Firma Capital Partners
Nathaniel Philip Rothschild – Chairman of Volex plc
Isabel dos Santos – Africa's richest woman and its first female billionaire
Gilbert Szlumper – General Manager of the Southern Railway (UK)
Rory Tapner – CEO of Coutts
Sir William Tritton – inventor of the tank and Chairman & Managing Director of Fosters of Lincoln
Lawrence Urquhart – Chairman of BAA
Marcus Weldon – President of Bell Labs
Mallory Evan Wijesinghe – businessman

Sport

Jo Ankier – athlete
Dina Asher-Smith – Olympic medal-winning sprinter
Barry Davies – sports commentator
Ayoola Erinle – England rugby player
Harry Gem – inventor of lawn tennis
Dame Katherine Grainger – Olympic gold medal-winning rower
Frances Houghton – Olympic gold medal-winning rower
Thomas Hollingdale – Welsh international rugby player
Adam Khan – racing driver
Corinna Lawrence – fencer
Jayne Ludlow – women's footballer
Edward Pegge – Welsh international rugby player
Leigh Richmond Roose – Welsh international footballer
Chris Sheasby – England rugby player
Annabel Vernon – Olympic medal-winning rower
Kieran West – Olympic gold medal-winning rower
Paul Bennett – Olympic gold medal-winning rower
Frances Houghton – Olympic medal-winning rower
Zoe Lee – Olympic medal-winning rower

Architects

Guy Maxwell Aylwin – architect
Walter Bagot – architect
Edward Middleton Barry – architect
Frederick Pepys Cockerell – architect
Sir William Emerson – President of the Royal Institute of British Architects
Sir Banister Fletcher – architect
Alfred Giles – architect
John Alfred Gotch – President of the Royal Institute of British Architects
Richard Phené Spiers – architect
John Whichcord Jr. – architect

Engineers

Mustafa Al-Bassam – software engineer and privacy activist
Sir William Anderson – President of the Institution of Mechanical Engineers
Henry Marc Brunel – civil engineer and son of Isambard Kingdom Brunel
Henry Brogden – civil engineer
William Clark – civil engineer and inventor
Henry Deane – engineer
Sir John Dewrance – mechanical engineer and inventor
Sir Douglas Fox – civil engineer
Walter Katte – civil engineer
Sir William Henry Preece – President of the Institution of Civil Engineers
Bill Strang – aerospace engineer
Julian Tolmé – civil engineer
Thomas Walker – civil engineer
Mark Whitby – civil engineer
Sir John Wolfe-Barry – civil engineer

Educators
 John William Adamson – first Master of the Department for the Training of Teachers
Sir William Atkinson – educator
Edward Ernest Bowen – author of the Harrow School song
Timothy Hands – Master of Magdalen College School
Elan Journo – Fellow and Director of Policy Research at the Ayn Rand Institute
Albert Mansbridge – educator
Alan Smithers – educationalist

Other

Asma al-Assad – First Lady of Syria
Thomas Armitage – founder of the RNIB
William Baker – stylist
Nick Barratt – genealogist and Director of Senate House Library in the University of London
Roshonara Choudhry – Islamic terrorist convicted of the attempted murder of MP Stephen Timms in 2010.
Sir William Coxen, 1st Baronet – Lord Mayor of London
Harry Dagnall – philatelist
Frederic Sutherland Ferguson – bibliographer
Peter Fox – University of Cambridge librarian
Harry Golombek – chess grandmaster
Bob Halstead – scuba diver
Sir Walter Howell – civil servant
Leonard Hussey – explorer
Dame Agnes Jekyll – philanthropist
Sir Harry Johnston – explorer
Helen Joseph – anti-apartheid activist
Sia Koroma – First Lady of Sierra Leone
Sir Ivison Macadam – first President of NUS and Director-General of Chatham House
Sir Joseph Pilling – civil servant
Hudson Stuck – explorer
Sir Francis Wyatt Truscott – Lord Mayor of London
Elizabeth Wilmshurst – civil servant
Alex Dodoo – Ghanaian academic, pharmacist and Director General of Ghana Standards Authority

References

External links

King's College London student lists

 
King's College London
King's College London